The Brunswick Pilots were a minor league baseball team based in Brunswick, Georgia. From 1913 to 1915, the Pilots played as members of the Class D level 1913 Empire State League, 1914 Georgia State League and 1915 Florida–Alabama–Georgia League. The Pilots hosted home minor league games at Palmotto Park. In 1906, Brunswick briefly hosted a team in the Georgia State League.

History
In 1906, Brunswick briefly hosted a team in the Class D level Georgia State League. On June 25, 1906, the Columbus River Snipes moved to Brunswick with a record of 24–16. After compiling a 5–1 record while based in Brunswick, the Columbus River Snipes/Brunswick team  ended the 1906 season with an overall record of 29–17, to place 2nd in the standings. Dudley Lewis and Bill Hessler served as managers. In the playoff, the Waycross Machinists defeated Brunswick 3 games to 1.

In 1913, the Brunswick "Pilots" began play as members of the six–team Class D level Empire State League. The Americus Muckalees, Cordele Babies, Thomasville Hornets, Valdosta Millionaires and Waycross Blowhards joined Brunswick in beginning league play on May 1, 1913.

The Empire State League was finalized at a February 19, 1913 meeting held in Brunswick. At that meeting C. C. Vaughn, of Brunswick was selected as league president, Oscar Groover of Thomasville was elected vice president, and L.J. Leavy of Brunswick was elected as secretary/treasurer. Leavy was chared with gaining entry as a minor league through the National Association of Professional Baseball Leagues, which proved successful. Empire State League rosters were limited to twelve players, and no more than three of the players on the roster could have prior service with higher-classification minor league teams, meaning the Class C level or above. Team salaries were capped at $1,000 total for the season. Teams traveled by rail and there were no Sunday games.

The Brunswick use of the "Pilots" nickname derived from the local river pilots, who guided ships at the Port of Brunswick.

In their first season of play, the Brunswick Pilots finished last in the Empire State League. In the first–half of the season, the Pilots had a six–game winless streak and two five–game winless streaks. The Pilots ended the 1913 season with a record of 42–57, placing 6th in the final Empire State League standings. With Bert Kite and Charlie Moran serving as managers, Brunswick finished 16.5 games behind the first place Valdosta Millionaires.

Continuing play in a new league, The Brunswick Pilots became members of the six–team Class D level Georgia State League, as the Empire State League changed names. The Pilots ended the 1914 season with a record of 53–51, placing 4th in the regular season standings. Bert Kite, Earl Bitting and  Dutch Jordan served as managers, as the Pilots finished 5.5 games behind the 1st place Cordele Ramblers in the final standings.

In their final season, the Brunswick Pilots joined the six–team Class D level Florida–Alabama–Georgia League, as the Georgia League evolved. Brunswick ended the 1915 season with a record of 36–37, placing 4th overall, and winning the 1st half pennant. Wade Reynolds served as manager. In the finals, the Valdosta Millionaires were leading the Brunswick Pilots 2 games to 1, when the series ended due to a player strike. The Florida–Alabama–Georgia League folded following the season.

Brunswick next hosted minor league baseball when the 1951 Brunswick Pirates began play in the Class D level Georgia-Florida League, as an affiliate of the Pittsburgh Pirates.

The ballpark
The Brunswick Pilots hosted minor league home games at Palmotto Park. The ballpark was located at Q Street & Ellis Street. Today, "Palmotto Square" is located on the same square block, still in use as a public park. The official address is 2718 Reynolds Street.

Timeline

Year–by–year records

Notable alumni
Ed Foster (1906)
Shovel Hodge (1914)
Dutch Jordan (1914, MGR) 
Charlie Moran (1913, MGR)
George Payne (1914)

See also
Brunswick Pilots players

References

External links
Baseball Reference

Defunct baseball teams in Georgia
Defunct Georgia State League teams
Baseball teams established in 1913
Baseball teams disestablished in 1915
Defunct Empire State League teams
Defunct Florida-Alabama-Georgia League teams
Brunswick, Georgia